Narasambudhi  is a railway station on Mysore–Chamarajanagar branch line. The station serves Badanavalu village near Nanjangud in Mysore district, Karnataka state, India.

Location
Narasambudhi railway station is located near Badanavalu village in Mysore district.

History 

The project cost . The gauge conversion work of the  stretch was completed.
There are six trains running forward and backward in this route.  Five of them are slow moving passenger trains.

See also
 Narasam Budhi village

References

External links

Railway stations in Mysore district